The 2016 season is Strømmen's 7th consecutive year in OBOS-ligaen and their second with Espen Olsen as manager.

Squad

Competitions

OBOS-ligaen

Results summary

Results by round

Fixtures

Table

Norwegian Cup

Squad statistics

Playing statistics

Appearances (Apps.) numbers are for appearances in competitive games only including sub appearances
Red card numbers denote:   Numbers in parentheses represent red cards overturned for wrongful dismissal.

Goal scorers

Assists

References

Strommen
Strømmen IF